William Cogswell (1838–1895) was a U.S. Representative from Massachusetts and a colonel in the Union Army during the American Civil War.

William Cogswell may also refer to:
 William Cogswell (New Hampshire physician) (1760–1831), surgeon's mate in the American Revolutionary War, physician, and grandfather of the politician
 William F. Cogswell (1819–1903), American portrait painter
 William Henry Cogswell (1798–1876), American physician
 William S. Cogswell Jr. (born 1975), member of the South Carolina House of Representatives